William Munger Boothby (April 1, 1918 – February 14, 2021) was an American mathematician and professor emeritus of mathematics at Washington University in St. Louis, known for his work in differential geometry including the book An introduction to differentiable manifolds and Riemannian geometry (1975; 2nd ed. 1986).

Boothby was originally from Detroit, and graduated from the University of Michigan in 1940. He became a pilot for the United States Army Air Forces during World War II. After the war, he returned to graduate study in mathematics at the University of Michigan, completing his Ph.D. in 1949. His dissertation, A Topological Study of the Level Curves of Harmonic Functions, was supervised by Wilfred Kaplan.

After postdoctoral research at ETH Zurich and the Institute for Advanced Study, and a junior faculty position at Northwestern University, he joined the Washington University faculty as a professor of mathematics in 1959. His early research concerned differential geometry; after publishing his book, which "defined the curriculum and standards of introductory graduate differential geometry courses worldwide", his interests shifted to control theory. He retired in 1988.

References

1918 births
2021 deaths
American centenarians
United States Army Air Forces pilots of World War II
20th-century American mathematicians
Differential geometers
Control theorists
University of Michigan alumni
Northwestern University faculty
Washington University in St. Louis faculty
Washington University in St. Louis mathematicians